Jerry Green (born April 16, 1936, in Atlanta, Georgia) is a former American football player in the American Football League. He played for the Boston Patriots. He played collegiately for the Georgia Tech football team.

1936 births
Living people
Players of American football from Atlanta
American football halfbacks
Georgia Tech Yellow Jackets football players
Boston Patriots players